Sean David Murphy is an American international law scholar currently serving as the Manatt/Ahn Professor of International Law at the George Washington University Law School in Washington, D.C., where he has been teaching since 1998. His primary areas of scholarly research are public international law, foreign affairs and the Constitution of the United States, international organizations, international dispute settlement, and law of the sea. Murphy served for ten years on the Board of Editors of the American Journal of International Law and is a former president of the American Society of International Law. In 2016, the United Nations General Assembly re-elected Murphy to serve as a Member of the U.N. International Law Commission (ILC). He was named by the ILC as Special Rapporteur for Crimes Against Humanity, a topic on which he has lectured widely.

Prior to his arrival at George Washington University Law School in 1998, Murphy was a legal counselor at the Embassy of the United States, The Hague from 1995 to 1998; in this position, he argued several cases before the International Court of Justice and represented the U.S. government in matters before the International Criminal Tribunal for the former Yugoslavia. He also served as a staff attorney for the Legal Adviser of the Department of State (1987-1995). From 1985 to 1986, he was a law clerk for Senior Judge Thomas Aquinas Flannery of the United States District Court for the District of Columbia. He is a member of the Maryland bar.

In addition to his academic appointment, he frequently serves as counsel, expert, or arbitrator in various fora, such as in arbitral cases before the International Centre for the Settlement of Investment Disputes and the Permanent Court of Arbitration; and as ad hoc judge at the International Tribunal for the Law of the Sea.

Murphy received his S.J.D. from the University of Virginia School of Law (1995; Ford Foundation Graduate Scholarship and Council on Foreign Relations Fellow), his LL.M. from the University of Cambridge (1987), his J.D. from Columbia Law School (1985; Editor-in-Chief of the Columbia Journal of Transnational Law), and his B.A. (magna cum laude and Phi Beta Kappa) from the Catholic University of America (1982). Murphy has published numerous articles and books on international law.

Selected works

Lectures 
 Crimes against Humanity in the Lecture Series of the United Nations Audiovisual Library of International Law
 Regime of Islands, in the Lecture Series of the United Nations Audiovisual Library of International Law

References 

Living people
George Washington University Law School faculty
University of Virginia School of Law alumni
Alumni of the University of Cambridge
Columbia Law School alumni
Year of birth missing (living people)
Presidents of the American Society of International Law
Members of the International Law Commission